The Hills Run Red is a 1966 Spaghetti Western film directed by Carlo Lizzani. The film stars Thomas Hunter in the heroic lead role, along with veteran American actors Henry Silva and Dan Duryea.

Plot synopsis

In the aftermath of the American Civil War, two rebel Texans are seen fleeing toward the Mexican border in a wagon, having made off with a huge sum of money stolen from the United States government. Just before reaching the safety of foreign soil they are intercepted by a U.S. army patrol. As the mounted soldiers close in, the men draw cards to decide who will stay on the wagon and draw the pursuit, and who will jump off with the loot and escape, keeping the other man's share safe until he can claim it. Ken Seagull (Nando Gazzolo) wins the draw, jumps off and successfully hides. Jerry Brewster (Thomas Hunter) crashes the wagon, is apprehended by the troopers, and is sent to a military prison.

Five years later, Brewster is released and returns home to reunite with his wife and son. He finds his house deserted and in ruins, but discovers his wife's journal, which tells him that Seagull not only gave her no aid, but told her nothing of the money or the fact that her husband was alive. Maddened by the betrayal, the unarmed Brewster immediately finds himself under gunfire: Seagull has learned of his release and sent men to get him out of the way once and for all. Running into the barn for cover, Brewster finds a mysterious stranger (Dan Duryea) who throws him a weapon with which Brewster kills his attackers. His benefactor, who introduces himself as Winnie Getz, offers to tell Seagull that, while Brewster killed the hired gunmen, Getz himself finished their job and killed their target. The seemingly homeless Getz says he hopes to parlay that false intelligence into a steady job with Seagull.

Getz goes on ahead, while Brewster (now using the name Jim Houston) follows on his quest for vengeance. Brewster soon learns that Seagull, now known as Ken Milton, has used his wealth to acquire a ranch and the services of vicious killer Garcia Mendez (Henry Silva), with whose help he has expanded his holdings by terrorizing other landowners. Brewster also learns that Seagull killed his wife, but finds his young son alive and living nearby as an orphan. The man called Houston gets a job with Mendez (while managing to stay out of sight of his employer "Milton") and, with Getz's help, proceeds to play a double game wherein he rides with Mendez and his killers, but secretly aids their intended victims.

Eventually Brewster, with the help of his son and the surprisingly loyal Getz, confronts and kills Mendez and his men, and eventually Seagull. Afterward Getz reveals himself to be a government agent who had been on Seagull/Milton's trail all along. The government restores all property to its rightful owners, but Getz assures the authorities that the ex-convict Brewster was indeed murdered in the ambush at the empty house, freeing "Houston" to begin a new life with his son.

Selected cast 
 Thomas Hunter as Jerry Brewster
 Henry Silva as Mendez
 Dan Duryea as Getz
 Nando Gazzolo as Ken Seagull
 Nicoletta Machiavelli as Mary Ann
 Gianna Serra as Hattie
 Loris Loddi as Tim Brewster
 Geoffrey Copleston as Brian Horner
 Guido Celano as Burger - Blacksmith
 Puccio Ceccarelli as Mendez henchman
 Guglielmo Spoletini as Pedro
 Mirko Valentin as Sancho
 Jeff Cameron as Randall

Production
The Hills Run Red was shot in Italy and Spain in 1966 with interiors shot at Dino De Laurentiis Studios in Rome and on newly constructed Western town set at Dinocitta.

Release
The Hills Run Red was released in Italy in September 1966.

Reception
From contemporary reviews, "Dool." of Variety noted the film had the "well photographed outdoor action sequences" and that the score was "serviceable" and that the film had "enough action [...] to fill three pix, but [The Hills Run Red] carries on the European tradition of shooting up everyone in sight" and that the film had "limited boxoffice appeal."  A review in the Monthly Film Bulletin found the film to be "a rip-roaring variation on the revenge theme, wholly traditional in style but all gutsy action from start to finish." The review went on to note that "even if the dialogue is clumsy and the hero's instinct for survival more than a little improbable, the action more than makes up for it."

From retrospective reviews, Alex Cox in his book 10,000 Ways to Die submits that the film was deliberately meant to evoke the Westerns of Anthony Mann.

References

Sources

External links

The Hills Run Red at Dan Duryea Central
 

1966 Western (genre) films
1966 films
1960s Italian-language films
English-language Italian films
English-language Spanish films
1960s English-language films
Spaghetti Western films
Films scored by Ennio Morricone
Spanish Western (genre) films
1960s multilingual films
Italian multilingual films
Spanish multilingual films
1960s Italian films